The Matasnillo River (also spelled Mataznillo) is a river in Panama, traversing southward from the hills north of Panama City through the heart of the city before entering Panama Bay and the Pacific Ocean.

Geography
The river course cuts through heavily built-up areas of Panama City, subjecting it to both industrial and residential pollution. The level of water contamination was rated as "critical", making it unfit for consumption or recreation.

The river empties into the Panama Bay at the juncture of the Marbella and Punta Paitilla neighborhoods.

References 

Rivers of Panama